Ghanaians in Japan are Japanese people of full or partial Ghanaian ancestry or Ghanaians who became naturalized citizens of Japan.

Overview
According to the foreign residents statistics of the Ministry of Justice, 2,005 Ghanaians are registered residents in Japan as of 2015. The number of Ghanaians  arriving in Japan began to increase in the 1990s.

Notable Ghanaians in Japan
Evelyn Mawuli
Abdul Hakim Sani Brown
Karen Nun-Ira
Michael Yano
 Jefferson Tabinas
 Paul Tabinas
 Zion Suzuki

References

History of Ghana
Ethnic groups in Japan
 
Japan